The Petition to His Majesty, The Memorial to the House of Lords, and The Remonstrance to the House of Commons, commonly referred to collectively as the 1768 Petition, Memorial, and Remonstrance, are a series of imprints that record a protest by the Virginia House of Burgesses in April of 1768 that was sent to the British government by then-acting Lieutenant Governor John Blair.

This particular imprint had been owned by David Hartley, sometime Member of Parliament and a long-time friend of Benjamin Franklin.  He probably received it from G.W. Fairfax, a George Washington friend, who returned to England in 1773.  Hartley was the sole official British signatory of the 1783 Treaty of Paris formally ending the American Revolution.  Hartley had long supported freedoms for all Englishmen, at home and in the colonies: freedoms sought in the PMR and later reflected in the Declaration of Independence.

This Virginia protest elicited no formal response from the British government.  However, in mid-1768, Virginia Governor General Sir Jeffrey Amherst was unceremoniously replaced by Lord Norborne Berkeley, Baron de Botetourt, who promptly came to Virginia, with a royal instruction "to reside constantly within the Colony" and to call for military aid if there was any "sudden commotion of the populace".

Virginia had notified the other colonies of its PMR, seeking support for its positions.  This letter, together with the Massachusetts Circular Letter, stimulated further protests.  By December 69, all the American colonies had formally protested taxation called for by the Townshend Acts.

Background 

In 1683, the Assembly of New York had passed a Charter of Liberties and Privileges asserting that "supreme legislative power should forever be and reside in the Governor, council, and people, met in general assembly", and enumerated citizen's rights including taxation voted only by the citizenry's representatives, trial by peers, exemption from martial law, exemption from the quartering of soldiers, and religious toleration.
  
In a 1748 visit to New York, Massachusetts Governor William Shirley wrote of the New York Assembly, "They seem to have left scarcely any part of His Majesty's prerogative untouched, and they have gone great lengths toward getting the Government, military as well as civil, into their hands."

Britain gained immensely by the 1756–1763 French and Indian War (a.k.a. Seven Years' War) but incurred large debt in doing so. To secure peace, the Grenville Ministry maintained 7,500 troops in America. Saddled with huge national debt and expenditures, the English government sought to have the colonies share this burden.  Several times, Parliament sought tax revenue to pay its debts; abandoning each attempt soon after it heard Colonial objections.  The 1764 Sugar Act imposed high tariff on molasses imports, followed by the 1765 Stamp Act, then the 1766 Declaratory Act, and then the 1767 Townshend Acts.
  
Early colonial objections emphasized taxation, later ones a constitutional issue—"no taxation without representation".  Already in 1764, it was clear that the British measures were not working.  George Grenville, the King's First Minister, drafted tax legislation but delayed it for a year.  Scheduled to go into effect on 1 November 65, the Stamp Act taxed legal and commercial documents, newspapers, books, dice, and playing cards.  After the 1765 Virginia Resolves appeared in colonial newspapers, merchants refused to buy the required stamps.  Parliament repealed the Stamp Act on 18 March 66.

Although official news of the Townshend Acts reached North America in September, '67, organized colonial protests began in 1768.  Between 2 December 67 and 15 February 68, the Pennsylvania Chronicle published twelve articles by John Dickinson—his letters from a Farmer in Pennsylvania, arguing that "Parliament had no right to impose taxes, only duties to encourage and regulate trade".  These letters were reprinted throughout colonial America.  On 20 January 68, the Massachusetts Assembly petitioned the King to repeal the legislation.

Seeking American unity, Boston's Samuel Adams suggested that colonial objections "should harmonize with each other".  This 11 February 68 Massachusetts Circular Letter, invited every colony to cooperate in resistance.  The British ordered the Massachusetts Assembly to rescind the letter.  It refused, and its royal governor dissolved it.  This led Virginia to generate the PMR on 14 April 68, and to announce it to sister colonies.  Then the 6th May New Jersey Assembly Petition to the King asserted "the Privilege of being exempt from any Taxation except as imposed … by themselves or Representatives".  Soon every colony protested.
  
Starting in 1766, the colonies tried non-importation agreements.  These helped induce the Stamp Act repeal because English merchants lost money shipping goods to destinations that would not accept them.  In 1768 every port city and nearly every region adopted its own agreement.  However, signing a non-importation agreement was one thing; making it effective was something else.  Some merchants asked for exorbitant prices; some defied the rules by importing goods, to the chagrin of those who complied.  The early agreements collapsed.  Nevertheless, non-importation was agreed on in the first Continental Congress.

On 10 May 73, the Tea Act granted a tea monopoly to the East India Company.  It also continued a small duty on tea.  Philadelphians protested en masse in October.  Bostonians tried to get their English tea agents to resign but failed.  On 16 Dec, after Governor Thomas Hutchinson blocked an attempt to return the Dartmouth, still loaded, to England, activists boarded three tea ships and dumped 342 containers of tea into the harbor. Massachusetts and Virginia, the most populous and wealthy colonies, were also the most influential.  On 17 June Massachusetts called for "a meeting of Committees from the several Colonies on this Continent".  Virginia supported the idea.  In 1774 this happened—the First Continental Congress.  Delegates included George Washington (Va.), Patrick Henry (Va.), John Adams (Ma.), Samuel Adams (Ma.), Joseph Galloway (Pa.), and John Dickinson (Pa.). Peyton Randolph (Va.) was chosen its president.

See also
 No taxation without representation

References

Sources 

 

 

  

 

History of the Thirteen Colonies
National human rights instruments
United States documents
1768 in law
1768 in the Thirteen Colonies
1768 documents
American political philosophy literature